Hajjiabad (also Romanized as Ḩājjīābād and Hājīābād; also known as Hajābād) is the capital of Zirkuh County, South Khorasan Province, Iran. At the 2006 census, its population was 4,333, in 1,026 families.

References 

Populated places in Zirkuh County

Cities in South Khorasan Province